Crest Foods is a family owned and operated business chain of grocery stores in Oklahoma, with the corporate office in Edmond. As of 2017, there are nine stores.  It buys direct from 150 manufacturers and the largest supplier in the state.

History
The company opened in 1946 as Nick's Brett Drive Grocery in Midwest City and grew throughout the 1950s and the 1960s. In 1964, the business moved to a new location in the Ridgecrest shopping center on Reno Avenue in Midwest City. They opened the first Crest Food stores in Midwest City.

In 1984, their second location opened in Midwest City. In 1997, their third location opened in Edmond, where the corporate offices are located. The name was shortened to Crest. In 1999, Nick and Cherry Harroz retired and passed on their company to their son Bruce Harroz.

In 2002, a fourth store was added in Moore. In 2004, a fifth store was added in Oklahoma City, and the following year, a sixth store opened in northern Oklahoma City. In 2010, a seventh store opened, the first to be named Crest Fresh Market, in southern Oklahoma City.

In 2013, an eighth location opened in Norman. This is the first Crest to open outside the Greater Oklahoma City Area in Norman. In August 2014, a 220,000 sq. ft. distribution center was acquired.

On January 23, 2017, it was announced that a ninth location will be added to the chain. The 106,565-square-foot store is targeted to open in early 2018. On April 20, 2018, it is announced that the Edmond store would be delayed by another two or three years. On the same announcement, it has pushed to forward on two stores with one in Yukon and the other in  Mustang.

Locations
It has stores in:
Midwest City, Oklahoma  (2)
Edmond, Oklahoma (1, 2 in TBD)
Moore, Oklahoma (1)
Oklahoma City, Oklahoma (3)
Norman, Oklahoma (1)
Yukon, Oklahoma (1)
Mustang, Oklahoma (TBD)

References

1946 establishments in Oklahoma
Retail companies established in the 1940s